King Leodegrance , sometimes Leondegrance, Leodogran, or variations thereof, is the father of Queen Guinevere in Arthurian legend. His kingdom of Cameliard (or Carmelide) is usually identified with Cornwall but may be located in Breton Cornouaille near the town of Carhaix-Plouguer, which is the Carhaise of L'Histoire de Merlin (13th century). 

Leodegrance had served Uther Pendragon, King Arthur's biological father and regnal predecessor. Leodegrance was entrusted with the keeping of the Round Table at Uther's death. When Guinevere marries Arthur, Leodegrance gives the young king the table as a wedding present. In later romance Leodegrance is one of the few kings who accept Arthur as his overlord. For this, his land is invaded by the rebel king Rience, but Arthur comes to his rescue and expels the enemy. Arthur meets Guinevere for the first time during this excursion, and they develop a love that eventually results in their fateful marriage.

According to the Lancelot-Grail prose cycle, Leodegrance fathered a second daughter out of wedlock; he also names this child Guinevere. The "False Guinevere" later treacherously convinces Arthur's court that she is his real wife and her sister is an impostor, forcing the real queen and her lover Lancelot into hiding with their friend Galehaut. Guinevere eventually returns and reclaims her throne.

In Welsh mythology, the father of Gwenhwyfar (Guinevere) is the giant Ogyruan/Ogyrvan or Gogyrfan, who is mentioned in a number of Middle Welsh texts.

In popular culture
Leodegrance was portrayed by Patrick Stewart in the 1981 film Excalibur and by Daragh O'Malley in the 2011 television series Camelot.

References

Arthurian characters
King Arthur's family
Knights of the Round Table
Mythological kings
Welsh giants